This list of museums in Northern Ireland contains museums which are defined for this context as institutions (including nonprofit organizations, government entities, and private businesses) that collect and care for objects of cultural, artistic, scientific, or historical interest and make their collections or related exhibits available for public viewing. Also included are non-profit art galleries, university art galleries and interpretive centres linked to sites of interest.  Museums that exist only in cyberspace (i.e., virtual museums) are not included.   Many other small historical displays are located in the country's stately homes, including those run by the National Trust.

Defunct museums
 Palace Stables Heritage Centre, now council offices, Armagh
 Ulster History Park, Gortin

References
Northern Ireland Museum Council
Irish Museums Association

See also
 :Category:Tourist attractions in Northern Ireland
Related lists for Northern Ireland
List of National Trust properties in Northern Ireland
List of nature reserves in Northern Ireland
List of parks in Northern Ireland
List of Ramsar sites in Northern Ireland
List of Areas of Special Scientific Interest in Northern Ireland
List of museums
Museums in the Republic of Ireland
Museums in England
Museums in Wales
Museums in Scotland

 
Northern Ireland
Museums
Museums